Club Morelos was a Mexican football club who participated in the 1920-21 Liga Mexicana and the 1921 Campeonato del Centenario. Both tournaments were held during the football championship of Mexico.

History
The club was founded in 1920 under the direction of Margarito Cejudo, a football enthusiast of Morelos. The team had a very short stint that only lasted from 1920-1922. Some of the players that were in the team were the founders of México FC. They played in San Pedro de los Pinos, then a small suburb of Mexico City.

See also
Football in Mexico

References

Defunct football clubs in Morelos
Association football clubs established in 1894
Football clubs in Mexico City
1894 establishments in Mexico
Primera Fuerza teams